Ischnophenax is a genus of moth in the family Gelechiidae. It contains the species Ischnophenax streblopis, which is found in India.

References

Gelechiinae